Vågaholmen (also called Våga) is the administrative centre of the municipality of Rødøy in Nordland county, Norway.  The village is located along the Tjongsfjorden, just west of the village of Tjong.

References

Rødøy
Villages in Nordland
Populated places of Arctic Norway